Angelique Kerber was the defending champion, but lost to Petra Kvitová in the quarterfinals.

Kvitová went on to win her second title in Sydney, defeating the previous year's finalist Ashleigh Barty in the final, 1–6, 7–5, 7–6(7–3).

Seeds
The top two seeds receive a bye into the second round.

Draw

Finals

Top half

Bottom half

Qualifying

Seeds

Qualifiers

Lucky losers

Qualifying draw

First qualifier

Second qualifier

Third qualifier

Fourth qualifier

Fifth qualifier

Sixth qualifier

References

External links
 Main Draw
 Qualifying Draw

]
Women's Singles